Guido Daccò (10 September 1947 – 29 July 2006) was an Italian race car and motorcycle racer from Limbiate. He began motorcycle racing in 1969 and from 1980 to 1984 he raced in Formula 2. He then drove in the 1985 24 Hours of Le Mans and began racing in Formula 3000. In 1988 he moved to the United States to drive in the Indy Lights series where he placed 10th in series points. In 1989 he made his CART debut for Dale Coyne Racing. Dacco had little success in CART and bounced from team to team until 1992, making 23 starts with a best finish of 12th. He failed to qualify for the Indianapolis 500 in his attempts in 1990 and 1991. He returned to Europe in 1992 to drive two races in German Formula 3 and then retired from racing. He made occasional drives in historic races and managed an FIA GT team.

He died on 29 July 2006, after a long battle with an undisclosed illness.

Racing career results

Complete British Formula One Championship results
(key) (Races in bold indicate pole position; races in italics indicate fastest lap)

Complete European Formula Two Championship results
(key) (Races in bold indicate pole position; races in italics indicate fastest lap)

Complete International Formula 3000 results
(key) (Races in bold indicate pole position; races in italics indicate fastest lap.)

American open-wheel racing results

American Racing Series

PPG Indy Car World Series
(key) (Races in bold indicate pole position)

Complete 24 Hours of Le Mans results

References

External links
CART statistics at ChampCarStats.com

1947 births
2006 deaths
Champ Car drivers
Indy Lights drivers
Italian racing drivers
Italian Formula One drivers
European Formula Two Championship drivers
International Formula 3000 drivers
24 Hours of Le Mans drivers
World Sportscar Championship drivers
British Formula One Championship drivers
Bettenhausen Racing drivers
EuroInternational drivers
Dale Coyne Racing drivers
Scuderia Coloni drivers